Mickfield Meadow is a  biological Site of Special Scientific Interest north of Mickfield in Suffolk. It is managed by the Suffolk Wildlife Trust.

Fertilisers and herbicides have never been used on this meadow, and as a result it has a rich variety of flora, including fritillary. The dominant grasses are meadow foxtail, cocksfoot, false oat-grass, timothy and Yorkshire fog.

There is access by walking along a field margin from Brook Lane.

References

Suffolk Wildlife Trust
Sites of Special Scientific Interest in Suffolk